Al-Sarkha, Bakhʽah or Bakhʽa ( or ,  - ) is a Syrian village in the Yabroud District of the Rif Dimashq Governorate. According to the Syria Central Bureau of Statistics (CBS), Al-Sarkha had a population of 1,405 in the 2004 census. Its inhabitants are predominantly Sunni Muslims and Greek Orthodox Christians. It is one of only three remaining villages where Western Aramaic is still spoken, the other two being Maaloula and Jubb'adin.

References

Bibliography

External links
 Samples of spoken Bakhah Aramaic at the Semitisches Tonarchiv (Semitic Audio Archive)

Populated places in Yabroud District
Eastern Orthodox Christian communities in Syria